Season thirteen of Dancing with the Stars premiered on September 19, 2011, on the ABC network.

Actor J.R. Martinez and Karina Smirnoff were crowned the champions, while Rob Kardashian and Cheryl Burke finished in second place, and talk show host Ricki Lake and Derek Hough finished in third.

Cast

Couples
Nine professional partners—Derek Hough, Maksim Chmerkovskiy, Cheryl Burke, Tony Dovolani, Mark Ballas, Lacey Schwimmer, Karina Smirnoff, Anna Trebunskaya, and Kym Johnson—returned this season. Maksim's brother, Valentin Chmerkovskiy, made his debut competing as a professional. Peta Murgatroyd and Tristan MacManus, part of season 12's troupe of dancers, also became professional partners for the first time. Louis van Amstel did not compete as a professional, but participated in a new segment called "Ballroom Battles", which would be canceled on November 7. The dance troupe consisted of six dancers: Sharna Burgess, Dasha Chesnokova, Oksana Dmytrenko, Sasha Farber, Kiki Nyemchek and Ted Volynets, plus the first eliminated male and female pros, who ended up being Val Chmerkovskiy and Peta Murgatroyd. 

The celebrity cast was revealed during an episode of Bachelor Pad on August 28, 2011. The twelve professionals were revealed on August 31, 2011 during Good Morning America. Actor Ryan O'Neal was planning on competing as a celebrity, but could not after knee surgery, so Carson Kressley took his place.
 
From the start, controversy erupted over the inclusion of Chaz Bono, the child of singers Sonny and Cher. His appearance resulted in backlash from conservative supporters of the show, who even threatened to boycott due to his transgender status. Despite the criticism, Bono received strong support from the LGBT community. It was stated in LGBT Weekly that "Bono has become the transgender community's living symbol of hope, strength and defiance against vitriolic hate. When ABC Television announced that Bono would appear on DWTS, he faced vile slurs and death threats from a group of trans-phobic women and men". The controversy did lead producers to hire extra security protection for his time on the show.

Host and judges
Carrie Ann Inaba, Len Goodman, and Bruno Tonioli returned as the judges, and Tom Bergeron and Brooke Burke Charvet returned as hosts.

Scoring charts

Notes

 : This was the lowest score of the week.
 : This was the highest score of the week.
 :  This couple finished in first place.
 :  This couple finished in second place.
 :  This couple finished in third place.
 :  This couple was in the bottom two, but was not eliminated.
 :  This couple was eliminated.

Highest and lowest scoring performances 
The highest and lowest performances in each dance according to the judges' 30-point scale are as follows.

Couples' highest and lowest scoring dances
Scores are based upon a potential 30-point maximum.

Weekly scores
Individual judges' scores in the charts below (given in parentheses) are listed in this order from left to right: Carrie Ann Inaba, Len Goodman, Bruno Tonioli.

Week 1: First Dances
Each couple performed either the cha-cha-cha or the Viennese waltz. Couples are listed in the order they performed.

Week 2: Top 11 
Each couple performed either the jive or the quickstep. Couples are listed in the order they performed.

Week 3: Most Memorable Year Week 
Each couple performed one unlearned dance. The foxtrot, rumba, samba, tango, and waltz were introduced. Couples are listed in the order they performed.

Week 4: Movie Week
Each couple performed one unlearned dance. The paso doble was introduced. Couples are listed in the order they performed.

Week 5: '80s Week
The couples performed one unlearned dance to a song released in the 1980s. Couples are listed in the order they performed.

Week 6: Broadway Week
Each couple performed one unlearned dance and a group Broadway dance. Couples are listed in the order they performed.

Week 7: Halloween Week
Each couple performed one unlearned dance and a team dance. Couples are listed in the order they performed.

Week 8: Instant Choreography Week
Each couple performed two unlearned dances. Couples are listed in the order they performed.

Week 9: Semifinals
Each couple performed two unlearned dances, one of which was the Argentine tango, and a cha-cha-cha relay. Couples are listed in the order they performed.

Week 10: Finals
On the first night, each couple performed two dances, one of which was a freestyle. On the second night, each couple performed one dance before the third-place couple was announced. The two remaining couples faced off and performed a samba. Couples are listed in the order they performed.
Night 1

Night 2

Dance chart 
The celebrities and professional partners danced one of these routines for each corresponding week:
 Week 1 (First Dances): One unlearned dance (cha-cha-cha or Viennese waltz)
 Week 2 (Top 11): One unlearned dance (jive or quickstep)
 Week 3 (Most Memorable Year Week): One unlearned dance 
 Week 4 (Movie Week): One unlearned dance 
 Week 5 ('80s Week): One unlearned dance 
 Week 6 (Broadway Week): One unlearned dance & group Broadway dance 
 Week 7 (Halloween Week): One unlearned dance & team dances 
 Week 8 (Instant Choreography Week): One unlearned dance & instant jive 
 Week 9(Semifinals): Two unlearned dances & cha-cha-cha Relay 
 Week 10 (Finals, Night 1): One unlearned dance & freestyle
 Week 10 (Finals, Night 2): Favorite dance of the season & instant samba

Notes

 :  This was the highest scoring dance of the week.
 :  This was the lowest scoring dance of the week.
 :  This couple danced, but received no scores.

Ratings

References

External links 

Dancing with the Stars (American TV series)
2011 American television seasons